Maripeda is a municipality and mandal in Mahabubabad district, Telangana, India.

Panchayats
There are 25 village panchayats in Maripeda mandal.
Abbaipalem
Anepur
Bavojigudem
Beechrajpalle
Burhanpur
Chillamcherla
Dharmaram
Thanda Dharmaram
Erjerla
Galivarigudem & thanda
Giripuram
Gundepudi
Jayyaram
Maripeda
Neelikurthy
Purushottamaigudem
Rampur
Thalla Ookal
venkampad
Thanamcherla
Yellampeta

References

Villages in Mahabubabad district
Mandals in Mahabubabad district